This is a list of episodes of the South Korean talk show Video Star which is currently hosted by Kim Sook, Park Na-rae, Park So-hyun and Sandara Park. It airs on MBC Plus every Tuesday at 20:30 (KST) starting July 12, 2016.

Episodes

2016

2017

2018

2019

External links

References 

Lists of variety television series episodes
Lists of South Korean television series episodes